Zviad Kvatchantiradze  (born 7 July 7 1965, Ozurgeti) is a Georgian parliamentarian and diplomat. Chairman of the EU-Georgia Parliamentary Committee on Association. First Vice Chairman of the Committee on Foreign Relations of the Parliament of Georgia. Leader of Majority. Member of the Parliamentary Assembly of the Council of Europe (PACE). He was formerly Consul General of Georgia in Istanbul, Turkey, from 2005-2009 and Secretary-General of the TRACECA Intergovernmental Commission from 2000 to 2004. Holds a rank of Ambassador Extraordinary and Plenipotentiary since 2001.

Education
Kvatchantiradze graduated from the Faculty of History and Law of the State University in Yaroslavl, Russia in 1990. In 1995 he obtained a diploma in Social Market Economy and Public Relations from Carl Duisberg College in Cologne, Germany.

Career

Early career
From 1991 to 1993, Kvatchantiradze was the manager of the academic interchange program at the Georgian branch of the ICSC-World Laboratory, an international non-governmental organisation in Tbilisi.

In 1993 Kvatchantiradze was among the pioneers of public relations in Georgia and co-founded the Tbilisi Public Relations Centre (TPRC), the first PR company in Georgia. The same year, under the leadership of conductor Jansug Kakhidze, he helped to found the Georgian Society of Patrons of Music. As co-president of the society he contributed to founding the Tbilisi Symphony Orchestra.

In January 1994 Kvatchantiradze won Germany's Carl Duisberg scholarship and moved to Cologne for to study. After graduating from the Carl Duisberg College he worked in a professional practice in Germany, including responsibilities in the German Foreign Office in Bonn.

In March 1996 Kvatchantiradze returned to Georgia and joined the civil service as a State Advisor in the state chancellery of the President of Georgia. He also served as director of the Department of European Integration and International Relations of the Ministry of Transport and Communications. From 1997 to 2000 he was a member of the Committee of Deputies in the European Conference of the Ministers of Transport (ECMT, now International Transport Forum), as well as a member of the Inland Transport Committee of the UN ECE.

Diplomat
In 2000 Kvatchantiradze  was elected a first Secretary-General of the Permanent Secretariat of the newly established intergovernmental organisation, Transport Corridor Europe-Caucasus-Asia (TRACECA), based in Baku, Azerbaijan,, the establishment of which he personally contributed. In 2002-2004 he also was a President (in office) of the Caspian International Club of Transport and Communications. In 2004 he returned to Tbilisi, Georgia and reentered the Georgian foreign service as Head of the Directorate for the Council of Europe in the Ministry of Foreign Affairs of Georgia. In 2005 Kvatchantiradze was appointed Consul General of Georgia to Turkey.

In politics and Parliament
Before joining politics Kvatchantiradze has been the Chairman-in-office of the board of the Georgian Quality Foundation since February 2010.. Since April 2012 founding member of the major oppositional political party "Georgian Dream- Democratic Georgia". In the last parliamentary elections (October 1, 2012) Georgian Dream as the political coalition under leadership of Bidzina Ivanishvili and Zviad Kvatchantiradze, as majoritarian candidate in the District No.60 in Ozurgeti from the Georgian Dream coalition won the elections and became ruling majority in the Parliament of Georgia, as well as Kvatchantiradze became a Member of the 8th Parliament of Georgia. Since October 3, 2012 Kvatchantiradze elected a First Vice Chairman of the Parliamentary Committee on Foreign Relations and Member at European Integration Committee. At the same time, in June 2015 he has been confirmed as Co-Chairman of the EU-Georgia Parliamentary Committee on Association.In 2015-2016 he was elected a Leader of Majority. In 2016 he was elected a MP of the 9th Parliament. 2016-2019 he was a Chairman of the Parliamentary Committee on Diaspora and Caucasus Issues. In February 2019 he went to opposition and became an independent Member of Parliament.

Personal life
Kvatchantiradze  is married with two sons. He speaks Georgian, English, German, Russian and Turkish languages.

References

External links 
 Ministry of Foreign Affairs of Georgia
 
Parliament of Georgia

1965 births
Living people
People from Guria
Diplomats of Georgia (country)